James Brailsford may refer to:
 James Frederick Brailsford (1888–1961), British radiologist
 James M. Brailsford Jr. (1910–1993), American judge